Salman Masalha (born November 4, 1953) is an Israeli poet, writer, essayist and translator.  Masalha is a bilingual writer who writes in Arabic and Hebrew, and publishes in both languages. His poetry has also appeared in other languages. Salman is a frequent contributor to left-leaning Israeli newspaper, Haaretz.

Biography
Masalha was born on November 4, 1953 to a Druze family in Maghar, a village in the Galilee in northern Israel. After graduating from high school he moved to Jerusalem, where he has been living since 1972. Masalha studied at the Hebrew University of Jerusalem and holds a Ph.D. degree in Arabic literature. He wrote his thesis on the mythological elements of ancient Arabic poetry. He taught Arabic language and literature at the Hebrew University and served as co-editor of the Concordance of Early Arabic Poetry. One volume of the concordance titled Six Early Arab Poets: New Edition and Concordance was published in 1999.

Writing career
Masalha is the author of eight volumes of poetry. Some of his Arabic and Hebrew poems have been performed to music and recorded by leading Israeli and Palestinian musicians, among them: Marwan Abado, Kamilya Jubran, Micha Shitrit, Yair Dalal and others.

In 2006, Masalha was awarded the Israel's President's Prize for Literature for his collection of Hebrew poetry In Place.

After first declaring he intended to boycott the 2015 general election, he ultimately endorsed Meretz.

Writing

Essays
The City of the Walking Flower, World Literature Today
He made a homeland of words, Haaretz, Sep. 5, 2008
The Arab Man is the Problem, The Arab Woman is the Solution, excerpts in MEMRI, Special Dispatch Series - No. 807
The Apache War, Haaretz, August 4, 2006 
No light at the end of the tunnel, Haaretz, January 19, 2011

Research
Between the Lines, (Arabic: Fahm al-Mantuq), digital edition, Elaph Library 2010
Six Early Arab Poets, new edition and concordance, (co-author), Institute of Asian and African Studies at the Hebrew University of Jerusalem, The Max Schloessinger Memorial Series, Jerusalem 1999
Mythological Aspects in Ancient Arabic Poetry (Hebrew: אספקטים מיתולוגיים בשירה הערבית הקדומה), Ph.D thesis, The Hebrew University of Jerusalem (1998)

Poetry
Ishq Mu'ajjal (Deferred Love, Arabic: عشق مؤجل), Raya Publishing House, Haifa 2016
Fi al-Thara, Fi al-Hajar (In Dust, In Stone, Arabic: في الثرى، في الحجر), Raya Publishing House, Haifa 2013
Lughat Umm (Mother Tongue, Arabic: لغة أم), Zaman Publications, Jerusalem 2006
Ehad Mikan (In Place, Hebrew: אחד מכאן), Am Oved Publications, Tel Aviv 2004
Khana Farigha, (Blank Space, Arabic: خانة فارغة), Zaman Publications, Jerusalem 2002.
Rish al-Bahr (Sea Feathers, Arabic: ريش البحر), Zaman Publications, Jerusalem 1999
Maqamat Sharqiyya (Oriental Scales, Arabic: مقامات شرقيّة), Jerusalem 1991
Ka-l-'Ankabut bila Khuyut (Like a Spider without Webs, Arabic: كالعنكبوت بلا خيوط), Jerusalem 1989
Maghnat Ta'ir al-Khuddar (Green Bird Song, Arabic: مغناة طائر الخضّر), al-Katib Publications, Jerusalem 1979

Op-Ed
Israeli apartheid exposed at the airport, Haaretz, Jun. 5, 2014 (article screen-shot is reproduced at falkland-islands Tumblr).

Translations
Arabic into Hebrew
Mahmoud Darwish, Memory for Forgetfulness, also known: Beirut Diary (Arabic: ذاكرة للنسيان, Hebrew: זכר לשכחה), with commentary and epilogue, Schocken Publications, Tel Aviv 1989
Sahar Khalifah, Wild Thorns (Arabic: الصبّار, Hebrew: הצבר), Galileo Publications, Jerusalem 1978

Hebrew into Arabic 
Efraim Sidon, Uzu and Muzu (Hebrew: אוזו ומוזו מכפר קאקרוזו, Arabic: أوزو وموزو من كفر كاكاروزو), Nazareth 2000
Jerusalem, Historical Studies (Arabic: القدس، دراسات في تاريخ المدينة), ed. Amnon Cohen, Yad Izhak Ben-Zvi Publications, Jerusalem 1990
Dror Green, The Intifadah Tales (Hebrew: אגדות האינתפאדה, Arabic: حكايا الانتفاضة), Jerusalem 1989
Haim Gouri, "Selected Poems, with an Introduction" (Arabic: خلخال ينتظر الكاحل), Masharef, No. 30, pp 204–231, 2007
Aharon Shabtai, Schizophrenic Homeland", (Arabic: شيزوفرينيا الوطن), selected poems with an introduction, Masharef, No. 23, pp 94–118, 2004
Agi Mishol, Selected Poems, Masharef, No. 17, pp 159–169, 2002

English into Arabic
Breyten Breytenbach, "selected poems", Masharef, No. 15, Haifa-Jerusalem, pp. 7–18 (1997)
Wislawa Szymborska, "selected poems", Masharef, No. 13, Haifa-Jerusalem, pp. 82–96 (1997)
Seamus Heaney, "selected poems", Masharef, No. 5, Haifa-Jerusalem, pp. 111–116, 1995

EditingBiblical Stories in Islamic Paintings (Arabic: قصص التّوراة في الرسومات الإسلامية), Israel Museum 1992

 References

External links
Salman Masalha, "In Place" on blogspot 
Salman Masalha on Poetry International Web 
"A Homeland of All its Citizens", Haaretz, September 21, 2006
"In The Dark Room", The Guardian, May 17, 2008
"Patches of Color", Haaretz, December 7, 2007
Poems in Eurozine"Israeli Apartheid Exposed at the Airport", Haaretz,'' Jun. 5, 2014

1953 births
Hebrew-language poets
Hebrew-language writers
Israeli Druze
Living people
Palestinian poets
Israeli Arabic-language poets
Palestinian translators
Palestinian literary critics

International Writing Program alumni